Borisovo is a rural locality (a village) in Beketovskoye Rural Settlement, Vozhegodsky District, Vologda Oblast, Russia. The population was 46 as of 2002.

Geography 
Borisovo is located 70 km southwest of Vozhega (the district's administrative centre) by road. Ivankovo is the nearest rural locality.

References 

Rural localities in Vozhegodsky District